José Navarro Morenés, iure uxoris Count of Casa Loja, (8 December 1897 – 13 December 1974) was a Spanish horse rider  who competed in the 1924 Summer Olympics, in the 1928 Summer Olympics, and in the 1948 Summer Olympics. He was born in Madrid.

In the 1924 Summer Olympics he finished 30th in the individual jumping and placed eighth with the Spain team in the team jumping. Four years later he won the gold medal as part of the Spanish team in the team jumping with his horse Zapatazo after finishing fifth in the individual jumping. Twenty years after his first medal, he won the silver medal in the team jumping and finished tenth in the individual jumping.

References

External links
 

1897 births
1974 deaths
Sportspeople from Madrid
Spanish male equestrians
Spanish show jumping riders
Equestrians at the 1924 Summer Olympics
Equestrians at the 1928 Summer Olympics
Equestrians at the 1948 Summer Olympics
Olympic equestrians of Spain
Olympic gold medalists for Spain
Olympic silver medalists for Spain
Olympic medalists in equestrian
Medalists at the 1948 Summer Olympics
Medalists at the 1928 Summer Olympics
20th-century Spanish people